Kolkata Police Friendship Cup is a football tournament organised by Kolkata Police every year for the local clubs of Kolkata. Over 500 clubs participate in this three-tier tournament.

It is an initiative of the Chief Minister of West Bengal Buddhadeb Bhattacharya and is aimed at improving public-police interface by striking the soccer sentiments of the city.

ESPN Star Sports are sponsors of the tournament and advertised in lines of the FA Premier League. They will fly five participants from the tournament for a tour of London football grounds.

The slogan is Para football at its best.

The 2006 Cup started on 24 July. 2006.

References

External links
Kolkata Police Friendship Cup

Football competitions in Kolkata
Football cup competitions in India
Recurring sporting events established in 2006
West Bengal Police
2006 establishments in West Bengal